Badara may refer to: 
Badara (name)
Badara, Burkina Faso, a village
Badara, Nagorno-Karabakh, a village
Badaratittha or Badara Tittha Vihara, a historic Theravada Buddhist vihara in Tamil Nadu, India